Undress is a studio album by American band The Felice Brothers. It was released on May 3, 2019 through Yep Roc Records.

Critical reception
Undress was met with generally favorable reviews from critics. At Metacritic, which assigns a weighted average rating out of 100 to reviews from mainstream publications, this release received an average score of 78, based on 6 reviews.

Track listing

Charts

References

2019 albums
The Felice Brothers albums
Yep Roc Records albums